Yassin, an alternative of Yasin, Yassine, Yaseen and Yacine, is a male given name. Common mostly in the Arab world and Muslim countries) is a surname and unisex given name of Arabic origin. The name comes from a chapter (surah) of the Quran called Ya-Sin. It is an epithet of the prophet Muhammad.

Notable persons

Given name
Yassin Adnan (born 1970), Moroccan writer and broadcaster
Yassin M. Aref, American prisoner
Yassin Ayoub (born 1994), Dutch-Moroccan footballer
Yassin El-Azzouzi (born 1983), French-Moroccan footballer
Yassin Barnawi (born 1993), Saudi Arabian footballer
Yassin Bouih (born 1996), Italian middle-distance runner
Yassin Chadili (born 1988), French footballer
Yassin Fekir (born 1997), French footballer 
Yassin Fortuné (born 1999), French footballer
Yassin Hamzah (born 1990), Saudi Arabian footballer 
Yassin Ibrahim (born 2000), German footballer
Yassin Idbihi (born 1983), German basketball player
Yassin Kadi (born 1955), Saudi Arabian businessman
Yassin Mikari, Tunisian-Swiss footballer
Yassin Maouche (born 1997), French footballer
Yassin Moutaouakil (born 1986), French footballer
Yassin Oukili (born 2001), Dutch footballer
Yassin al-Haj Saleh (born 1961), Syrian writer and political dissident

Surname
Ahmed Yassin (1937–2004), Palestinian imam and politician and founder of Hamas
Anwar Yassin, Lebanese former detainee in Israeli prisons, member of the Popular Guard, the armed wing of the Lebanese Communist Party (LCP), and the broader Lebanese National Resistance Front 
Asser Yassin (born 1981), Egyptian actor, writer and film producer
Essam Yassin (born 1987), Iraqi footballer
Hussein Yassin (born 1943), Palestinian writer
Kamarul Ariffin Mohamed Yassin (born 1934), Malaysian chairman of the World Scout Committee
Muhyiddin Yassin (born 1947), Malaysian politician and prime minister
Nuseir Yassin (born 1992), Palestinian-Israeli video blogger best known for his video series Nas Daily 
sebastian yaseen (born 1992),
British born, played baseball for Great Britain in youth.
Omar Rabie Yassin (born 1988), Egyptian footballer 
Osama Yassin (born 1964), Egyptian politician and minister of youth
Rabie Yassin (born 1960), Egyptian footballer and football manager

See also
Yasin (name)
Yassine (name)
Yacine (name)
Yaseen (name)

References

Arabic-language surnames
Arabic masculine given names